Ranipuram (also known by its former name Madathumala) is a village and a major tourist attraction in the Kasaragod district of the Indian state of Kerala. It is located near Talakaveri Wildlife Sanctuary in Kerala-Karnataka border.

See also
 Kanhangad
 Kasaragod
 Tourist attractions in Kasaragod

References

Villages in Kasaragod district
Hill stations in Kerala
Panathur area